Streptolidine is an amino acid isolated from the hydrolyzate of the Streptomyces antibiotics 
streptothricin and streptolin.  Its structure was first elucidated by chemical degradation and later by x-ray crystallography.

Synthesis 
Syntheses have been accomplished from D-ribose and D-xylose.

References 

Amino acids
Guanidines
Imidazoles